Kerala State Financial Enterprises Limited (KSFE) is a public sector chit fund and loan company based in Thrissur city, Kerala, India.

History
The company started functioning on 6 November 1969, with Thrissur city as its headquarters. It started with a capital of Rs 2,00,000, and had 45 employees and 10 branches. As of 2021, it has 600 branches and eleven regional offices at Thiruvananthapuram, Kollam,  Kottayam, Ernakulam, Thrissur, Kozhikode, Kannur, Attingal, Alappuzha, Kattappana and Malappuram. KSFE is a Miscellaneous Non-Banking Financial Company (MNBFC) and is fully owned by the Government of Kerala. KSFE does not come under the regulation of Reserve Bank of India since it is not a Non-Banking Financial Company.

KSFE is one of the two chit fund companies owned by the government in the whole of India. The other company is Mysore Sales International Limited (MSIL) owned by the government of Karnataka. KSFE's purpose at founding was to provide an alternative to unscrupulous private-sector chit fund organisers. In 2000, it had 77% of the capital volume of the chit fund business in Kerala, though just 37.5% of the number of chit funds.

Controversies
In November 2019, the Vigilance and Anti-Corruption Bureau conducted mass raids on the KSFE offices Ltd and alleged major anomalies in its transactions and schemes.

References

External links
 http://www.ksfe.com
 https://www.facebook.com/KSFE.Ltd.Official/
 https://twitter.com/KSFE_Ltd

State agencies of Kerala
Financial services companies in Thrissur
Government finances in Kerala
1969 establishments in Kerala
Government agencies established in 1969